Richmond "Rich" Gosselin (born April 25, 1956) is a Canadian retired professional ice hockey player who played in the World Hockey Association (WHA) and the Swiss-A League. He was drafted in the seventh round of the 1976 NHL Amateur Draft by the Montreal Canadiens. Gosselin played three games with the Winnipeg Jets during the 1978–79 WHA season, after which he went overseas to play in Switzerland.

Gosselin served as a head coach in various European leagues after his playing career ended. In Manitoba, he has coached the Eastman Midget 'AAA' Selects, South East Prairie Thunder, and Steinbach Pistons junior hockey team.  Gosselin coached the Prairie Thunder to a second-place finish at the 2009 Allan Cup.

References

External links

1956 births
Canadian ice hockey centres
Canadian ice hockey coaches
EHC Biel players
Flin Flon Bombers players
HC Fribourg-Gottéron players
HC La Chaux-de-Fonds players
Ice hockey people from Manitoba
Living people
Montreal Canadiens draft picks
People from Eastman Region, Manitoba
Winnipeg Jets (WHA) players
Canadian expatriate ice hockey players in Switzerland